Nittei may refer to:

Nittei Maru (the ship "Nittei")
 Nittei Maru, sunk January 1945, see List of shipwrecks in January 1945
 Nittei Maru, sunk May 1945, see List of shipwrecks in May 1945

See also
 Nitte, village in India
 Nitty (disambiguation)
 Nitti (disambiguation)

Ship names